Eana incanana is a moth of the  family Tortricidae. It is found in most of Europe (except Iceland, Ireland, Portugal and part of the Balkan Peninsula), east to the eastern Palearctic realm.

The wingspan is 17–23 mm. Adults are on wing in July.

The larvae feed on the flowers of bluebell (Hyacinthoides non-scripta) and  oxeye daisy (Leucanthemum vulgare).

External links
 Fauna Europaea
 UKmoths

Tortricinae
Moths described in 1852
Moths of Asia
Moths of Europe
Taxa named by James Francis Stephens